My Love may refer to:

Music

Albums
 My Love (Janice Vidal album), 2005, or the title song
 My Love (Lisa Brokop album), 1991, or the title song
 My Love (Petula Clark album), 1966, or the 1965 title song (see below)
 My Love: Essential Collection, a 2008 album by Celine Dion, or the title song (see below)
 My Love, a 2007 album by Chae Yeon, or the title song
 My Love (J-Walk album), 2008
 My Love (Hebe Tien album), 2011
 My Love (EP), a 2009 EP by Enric Sifa

Songs
 "My Love" (Baekhyun song), 2020
 "My Love" (Celine Dion song), 2007
 "My Love" (The-Dream song), 2009
 "My Love" (Jill Scott song), 2008
 "My Love" (Joe song), 2007
 "My Love" (Julio Iglesias song), 1988
 "My Love" (Justin Timberlake song), 2006
 "My Love" (Kele Le Roc song), 1999
 "My Love" (Lee Jong-hyun song), 2012
 "My Love" (Lionel Richie song), 1983
 "My Love" (Little Texas song), 1994
 "My Love" (London Boys song), 1987
 "My Love" (Martin Solveig song), 2018
 "My Love" (Mary J. Blige song), 1992
 "My Love" (Namie Amuro song), 2009
 "My Love" (Paul McCartney and Wings song), 1973
 "My Love" (Petula Clark song), 1965
 "My Love" (Rosy & Andres song), 1976
 "My Love" (Route 94 song), 2014
 "My Love" (Westlife song), 2000
 "My Love", by Ciara from Ciara: The Evolution
 "My Love", by Florence and the Machine from Dance Fever
 "My Love", by Jack Gilinsky, 2020
 "My Love", by Lene Marlin from Another Day
 "My Love", by Lenny Kravitz from Are You Gonna Go My Way
 "My Love", by Majid Jordan from the self-titled album
 "My Love", by Pixie Lott from Turn It Up
 "My Love", by Selena from the self-titled album
 "My Love", by Sia from The Twilight Saga: Eclipse
 "My Love", by Wale from Shine
 "My Love", by Whitney Houston from Just Whitney

Film and television
 My Love (1940 film), a Soviet comedy film
 My Love (1970 film), a Bollywood romance
 My Love (2006 film), a Russian animated short film by Aleksandr Petrov
 My Love (2007 film), a South Korean romantic comedy
 My Love (2021 film), a Chinese romantic drama film
 My Love, a 2005 Russian television series starring Denis Matrosov
 Meu Amor, English My Love, a 2009-2010 Portuguese telenovela

Other uses
 My Love (horse), French Thoroughbred racehorse that won the 1948 Epsom Derby

See also
 "Min kärlek", a 2004 song by Shirley Clamp
 "My Love, My Love", a 1953 popular song
 My Love, My Love (film), a 1967 French drama
 Term of endearment